The Moraitis School is a co-educational private school in Athens, Greece. It is located in Psychico, a suburb north of the Greek capital.  In student population terms, the Moraitis school is one of the largest private schools in Athens. Its teaching aims at university entry.

It has 1700 students and 240 teachers in kindergarten, primary, middle school and high school.

History 
The school was founded in 1936 by Charles Beregean (Karolos Berzan), a mathematician (there is no source verifying either a degree or any articles in mathematics authored by Beregean), under the name “Standard Lyceum of Athens”.     It moved to its current location in 1952, when ownership was transferred to  – whose name the school has adopted since 1976. After Antonis Moraitis' death in 1981, property and administration of the school was transferred to his daughters: Chrysanthi Moraiti-Kartali (middle and high school) and Katerina Moraiti (primary school, until her death in 1996). Today the school is run by Chrisanthi Moraiti-Kartali, Giorgos Kasimatis, Antonis Kartalis and Giorgos Kartalis.

The school proclaims 12 fundamental principles (Dodecalogue), ranging from religious tolerance to the equivalent of Beckett's "fail again; fail better" premise, as a guide for all its members.

Academics 
Almost all of the school's students are enrolled to universities in Greece and abroad, upon graduation. For their final two years, students at Moraitis can follow either the Greek educational system curriculum or the International Baccalaureate programme.

About 16% of Moraitis students achieve a grade of more than 19/20 in the Pan-Hellenic Examinations, with about 50% achieving over 17/20. 
In 2013, the average grade of Moraitis School IB students was 36/45 (compared to a global average of 29), with two students achieving a grade of 45/45 and five 44/45. The average grade for each subject the school offers was higher than the global average.

Students from the Moraitis School IB have been accepted at institutions around the world including the University of Cambridge, the University of Oxford, Imperial College, Bristol University, the University of Edinburgh, the University of Bath, the University of Warwick and the University of York in the UK; Harvard, Columbia, Yale, Georgetown, Berkeley, Penn, Michigan in the USA; Sciences Po, Sorbonne and École nationale supérieure des Beaux-Arts in France.

The school has a good record in teaching foreign languages, with 74% of examined students earning the Cambridge Certificate of Proficiency in English (compared to a national average of 50%), 88% of examined students earning the Delf B2 exam in French, 88% earning the Zertifikat B2 exam and 100% the Zertifikat C1 in German.

For mathematics, physics and chemistry, students are split into groups according to their ability in these fields during gymnasium. This approach allows teachers to tailor their lessons accordingly. Moraitis School students have performed exceptionally well in mathematics and physics competitions, with its students earning the top awards for the panhellenic mathematics competition every year. In 2013 it was the first school in Greece in mathematics.

Student activities 
Sports  have always been encouraged and are an important part of the Moraitis School life experience despite the limited athletic facilities available within the school grounds. Its sport teams (football, basketball, volleyball, track and field) have excelled in competitions both within Greece and in Europe.
 
In addition to sports teams the Moraitis school has a forensics (debating) team that has achieved distinctions in national and international tournaments/competitions. In 2011, three out of the eight students selected from all of Greece during the 23rd National Selection Conference of the European Youth Parliament in Athensto represent Greece in three international conferences of the European Youth Parliament were High school students of the Moraitis School.

School clubs in the Middle School and High School include the UNESCO Club, the Theatre Club, the Comedy Club, the Film Club, the Modern Dance Club, the Science Fiction Club, the Applications of Science Club, the Digital Laboratory Club, the Yoga Club, the Modern Art and Architecture Club, the Music Club, the Musical Band Club, the Photography Club, the Entrepreneurship Club, the Journalism Club, the Environmental Club, the Painting Club, the Photography Club, the Volleyball Club, the Basketball Club, the Soccer Club, the Aerobics Club, the Tennis Club, and the Track and Field Club. The yearbook, Efivos (Έφηβος) is produced by students.

The annual school fair ("Panigiri"). is organised by its high-school students once a year, the Panigiri hosts activities and events in order to raise money for charity. The Panigiri is held on the weekend before the Easter break.

Since 2011 the alumni association of the Moraitis school (SASM) has hosted an annual, two-day alumni fair for charity.

The school has been taking part in the F1 in Schools competition for 3 years. The 2016 team of Moraitis School, Aeolus Racing placed 7th in the 2016 F1 in Schools World Finals, held in Austin, Texas.

Bullying policy
The school was the first school in Greece in 1994 to introduce an anti-bullying policy. The school today has a unique and comprehensive anti bullying programme.

Tuition and size 
The tuition ranges from €6500 (nursery school) to €13700 (IB Diploma). The school has discounts for siblings. The school funds a scholarship program that every year gives the opportunity to very good students from all socioeconomic backgrounds the opportunity to study there.

Notable alumni 
Apostolos Doxiadis, novelist, mathematician, playwright
Giorgos Lanthimos, actor, director, producer, Academy Award nominee
Evgenia Manolidou, orchestra conductor and television presenter
Leon Patitsas, founder and owner of Atlas Maritime
Haris Romas, actor, director
Takis Arapoglou, ex-chairman of the National Bank of Greece
Yanis Varoufakis, professor, director, Hoover fellow, former economist-in-residence at Valve, Greek Minister of Finance
Joe Kleidonas, sports director

References

External links
School website
School's IBO Profile

Private schools in Greece
International Baccalaureate schools in Greece
Education in Athens
1936 establishments in Greece
Educational institutions established in 1936